Eric Rosenblith (December 11, 1920 – December 16, 2010) was an Austrian-born American violinist. He was the former concertmaster of the Indianapolis and San Antonio Symphony Orchestras, and had performed as a soloist and chamber musician throughout North America, Europe, and Asia. Rosenblith served as chairman of the New England Conservatory's string department for more than twenty-five years and was a faculty member of the Hartt School as well as the Longy School of Music in Cambridge, Massachusetts. He was a visiting professor at the University of Kansas.

Rosenblith received the Licence de Concert from the Ecole Normale de Musique de Paris. He was awarded an honorary D.Mus. from the New England Conservatory. His violin teachers included: Jacques Thibaud and Jose Figueroa in Paris,  Carl Flesch in London, and Bronislaw Huberman in New York.

An elegant and distinguished performer, Rosenblith premiered and recorded many new works by American composers including David Stock, George Crumb, Alan Lighty, and Lucia Dlugachevsky. Rosenblith edited and translated the newly revised Art of Violin Playing by Carl Flesch. He founded and served as the artistic director of the International Musical Arts Institute of Fryeburg, Maine. Rosenblith regularly gave master classes in the United States, the United Kingdom, Korea, Taiwan, and the People's Republic of China.

Among Rosenblith's students are world-renowned composer Lauren Bernofsky, Xin Ding of the Boston Symphony Orchestra, Chiun-Teng Cheng of the Cincinnati Symphony Orchestra, and Janice Tucker Rhoda, author of The ABCs of Strings.

Recordings 
Rosenblith released recordings on Columbia, CRI, Crest, and Parjo. Among his releases was Complete Works for Violin and Piano by Johannes Brahms with pianist Heng-Jin Park.

Bibliography 
 Carl Flesch (1873–1944), The Art Of Violin Playing, Books 1 & 2 Translated & Edited by Eric Rosenblith. New York: Carl Fischer Music, 
 Eric Rosenblith (1920-2010), "‘Ah, You Play the Violin…': Thoughts Along the Path to Musical Artistry," New York: Carl Fischer Music, 

 "Violinist and pedagogue Eric Rosenblith dies," The Strad, May 23, 2010, https://web.archive.org/web/20150915054553/http://www.thestrad.com/cpt-latests/violinist-and-pedagogue-eric-rosenblith-dies/

References

External links 
  Eric Rosenblith on WBUR Radio in 2000 on "teaching the violin"

1920 births
2010 deaths
American classical violinists
Male classical violinists
American male violinists
American people of Austrian-Jewish descent
Austrian emigrants to the United States
Austrian Jews
Concertmasters
Longy School of Music of Bard College faculty
New England Conservatory faculty
University of Hartford Hartt School faculty
University of Kansas faculty
People from Fryeburg, Maine
20th-century classical violinists
20th-century American male musicians
20th-century American violinists